Barwe may refer to:

Barwe language, Zimbabwe
Prabhakar Barwe, Indian painter